The Mannville Group is a stratigraphical unit of Cretaceous age in the Western Canadian Sedimentary Basin. 

It takes the name from the town of Mannville, Alberta, and was first described in the Northwest Mannville 1 well by A.W. Nauss in 1945.

Lithology
The Mannville Group consists of interbedded continental sand and shale  in the base, followed by a calcareous sandstone member, marine shale, glauconitic sandstone and salt and pepper sandstone. An additional non-marine sequence is present in north-eastern Alberta.

Hydrocarbon production

Bitumen is produced from the McMurray Formation at the Athabasca Oil Sands. Heavy Oil is produced from the Wabiskaw Member of the Clearwater Formation in the Wabasca oil field, and from multiple formations in the Lloydminster and Provost areas in eastern Alberta and western Saskatchewan. Natural gas is extracted from the Ostracod and Glauconite beds in southern Alberta, and light oil is extracted from the Ellerslie Member in central and southern Alberta. Multiple oil fields and gas fields tap into the Manville Group. 

Total gas reserves amount to 316,799 x 106m³ in the Lower Mannville and 644,774 x 106m³ in the Upper Mannville. Recoverable oil reserves amount to 105.64 x 106m³ in the Lower Mannville and 199.20 x 106m³ in the Upper Mannville.

Distribution
It occurs in the sub-surface in central Alberta, extending east-west from Edmonton to Lloydminster and north-south from the Deep Basin to the United States border. It is present in the sub-surface in west-central and southern Saskatchewan.

Relationship to other units

The Mannville Group is discomformably overlain by the Joli Fou Formation shale of the Colorado Group. It rests unconformably on the older Paleozoic carbonates.

It is correlated with the lower Blairmore Group in the Canadian Rockies foothills and to the Bullhead Group and the Spirit River Formation of the Fort St. John Group in north-western Alberta. It is also equivalent to the Cantuar Formation in Saskatchewan and the Swan River Formation in Manitoba.

Subunits
The Mannville Group includes the following sub-units:

Central and southern Alberta

In southern Alberta, the Ellerslie Member is replaced by the Sunburst Member, Taber Sandstone, and Cutbank Sandstone.

Athabasca region

Lloydminster region

Southern Saskatchewan

References

Lower Cretaceous Series of North America
Stratigraphy of Alberta